The Saga of Tanya the Evil, known in Japan as , is a Japanese light novel series written by Carlo Zen and illustrated by Shinobu Shinotsuki. An anime television series adaptation by NUT aired from January 6, 2017 to March 31, 2017. Crunchyroll has licensed the series in North America. The opening theme is "Jingo Jungle" by Myth & Roid and the ending theme is "Los! Los! Los!" ("Come On! Come On! Come On!") by Aoi Yūki as Tanya Degurechaff.

On June 19, 2021, a second season was announced. The main cast and staff are returning to reprise their roles.

Setting
During the early 1920s on an alternate Earth, an Imperial Germany-esque power (known as the Empire) rules over a large portion of alternate Europe and possesses a high degree of industrial and military might, but is surrounded on all sides by many potential enemies and few allies. War eventually breaks out between the Empire and its enemies: the Francois Republic and the Legadonia Entente Alliance (analogous to real-world France and Sweden/Norway respectively). A young girl, Tanya Degurechaff, is recruited into the Empire's Mage Corps for the war effort. Unbeknownst to everyone but her, Tanya is actually a reincarnated Japanese salaryman, whose staunch atheism and refusal to acknowledge a powerful deity as 'God' in the moments before his death causes the deity to reincarnate him into a young girl in an alternate war-torn Europe as punishment.

Series overview

Episode list

Season 1 (2017)

Notes

References

External links

 

Saga of Tanya the Evil, The